The Banking Codes and Standards Board of India (BCSBI)  is an independent banking industry watchdog that protects consumers of banking services in India. The board oversee compliance with the "Code of Bank's Commitment to Customers".  It is not a compensation mechanism and looks into an individual complaint only to the extent it points to any systemic compliance failure. It is an independent and autonomous body, registered as a separate society under the Societies Registration Act, 1860 on 18 February 2006. The Reserve Bank of India extended financial support to the Board, meeting its expenses for the first five years. However, on 28 September 2021, the member banks passed resolutions approving BCBSI dissolution. Accordingly it has stopped its operations and is under dissolution.

Main aims 
 To plan, evolve, prepare, develop, promote and publish voluntary, comprehensive Code and Standards for banks, to provide fair treatment to their customers.
 To function as an independent and autonomous watchdog to monitor and ensure that the Codes and Standards are adhered to.
 To conduct and undertake research of Codes and Standards currently in use around the world.
 To enter into covenants with banks on observance of codes and standards and to train employees of such banks about the Codes.
 To help people affected by natural calamities.

History 
S S Tarapore (Former deputy general of RBI )  came up with an idea to form a committee for the benefit of customer so that they can get better financial services.

Governing Council 
The board is governed by a six-member governing Council including one chairman.

Members 
As of February 2013, 69 scheduled commercial banks, 11 Urban Co-operative Banks and 54 regional rural banks are members of the board.

See also 
 Indian Banks' Association

References

External links 
    
 Code of Bank’s Commitment to Customers in English
 Code of Bank’s Commitment to Customers in Hindi
  Code of Bank's Commitment to Micro and Small Enterprises in Hindi

Organisations based in Mumbai
Government agencies of India
2006 establishments in Maharashtra
Banking in India
Consumer organisations in India
Government agencies established in 2006